The 1993 Tokyo Indoor also known as "Seiko Super Tennis" was a men's tennis tournament played on indoor carpet courts in Tokyo, Japan that was part of the  IBM 1993 ATP Tour and was an ATP Championship Series event. The tournament was held from 11 October through 17 October 1993. Matches were the best of three sets. Ninth-seeded Ivan Lendl won his second consecutive singles title at the event and his fifth in total.

Finals

Singles

 Ivan Lendl defeated  Todd Martin 6–4, 6–4
 It was Lendl's 2nd singles title of the year and the 94th and last of his career.

Doubles

 Grant Connell /  Patrick Galbraith defeated  Luke Jensen /  Murphy Jensen 6–4, 6–4

References

External links
 ITF tournament edition details

Tokyo Indoor
Tokyo Indoor
Tokyo Indoor